Imaginary man is NaNa's second album, released on June 26, 2002, by Warner Music Japan. As with their last album "VOID", the recording, mix-down and mastering on the new album has taken place in Tokyo, London and New York. It is composed of the 12 songs. The very NaNa songs are listed from the start of this album. These all have a strong individuality, catchy and high quality. If the "VOID" had been made using a lot of experimental approach, this "Imaginary man" with considering of the same flow has moreover came to the article that bring maturity. The album was released in the United States in 2007.

Credits 
Chikako Watanabe – vocals and keyboard on track 
Shigeo Tamaru – producer, arrangement, guitars and all other instruments
Recorded by Shigeo Tamaru and Kenji Nagashima at Sidekick Studio, Yokohama, Japan, and at Kangaroo Studio, Idea Sound, Onkio Haus, Tokyo, Japan.
Mixed by Clive Goddard at Strongroom, London.
Assisted by Myles Clarke, Tom Paterson at Strongroom, London.
Mastered by Ted Jensen at Sterling Sound, New York.

Track listing 
 "The Blue Bird"
 "Anonymous Letter"
 "Primrose Path"
 "IV silence"
 "C-357"
 "Cyberface Run"
 "Child's Play"
 "Mother"
 "The cry of the wondering spirit"
 "JUDY"
 "Iris"
 "Acacia"

References

External links
 www.song5.com
 NaNa - Discography 'Imaginary man' Warner Music Japan
 Imaginary man discography at Discogs
 Musicbrainz Imaginary man
 Imaginary man - NaNa AllMusic

2002 albums
NaNa (band) albums